James Philip Macpherson (20 November 1842 – 23 August 1891) was an Australian politician and pastoralist in the colony of Victoria. He served as a member of the Victorian Legislative Council for Nelson from 1887 until his death in 1891.

Macpherson was born in Moonee Ponds, Melbourne, the son of John and Helen ( Watson) Macpherson. He was educated at Scotch College, Melbourne. His brother, John Alexander MacPherson, was premier of Victoria from 1869 to 1870.

Macpherson died following a period of ill health on 23 August 1891 at Scott's Hotel in Melbourne. He was 48.

References

1842 births
1891 deaths
19th-century Australian politicians
Australian pastoralists
Members of the Victorian Legislative Council
Politicians from Melbourne
Australian people of Scottish descent
19th-century Australian businesspeople
People from Moonee Ponds, Victoria
People educated at Scotch College, Melbourne